Taylor Springs is a village in Montgomery County, Illinois, United States. The population was 690 at the 2010 census.

Geography

Demographics

As of the census of 2000, there were 583 people, 250 households, and 162 families residing in the village. The racial makeup of the village was 98.80% White, 0.17% Native American, 0.69% from other races, and 0.34% from two or more races. Hispanic or Latino of any race were 1.03% of the population.

There were 250 households, out of which 31.2% had children under the age of 18 living with them, 52.4% were married couples living together, 9.2% had a female householder with no husband present, and 34.8% were non-families. 31.2% of all households were made up of individuals, and 13.2% had someone living alone who was 65 years of age or older. The average household size was 2.33 and the average family size was 2.91.

In the village, the population was spread out, with 24.7% under the age of 18, 7.5% from 18 to 24, 29.2% from 25 to 44, 22.0% from 45 to 64, and 16.6% who were 65 years of age or older. The median age was 39 years. For every 100 females, there were 107.5 males. For every 100 females age 18 and over, there were 99.5 males.

The median income for a household in the village was $29,773, and the median income for a family was $35,000. Males had a median income of $37,361 versus $18,056 for females. The per capita income for the village was $14,279. About 3.8% of families and 9.1% of the population were below the poverty line, including 5.4% of those under age 18 and 15.1% of those age 65 or over.

References

External links
 Taylor Springs Illinois, Historical Society of Montgomery County Illinois
  Taylor Springs Illinois Centennial Homepage

Villages in Montgomery County, Illinois
Villages in Illinois